Epanastasis atlanticella is a moth in the family Autostichidae. It was described by Daniel Lucas in 1937. It is found in Morocco.

References

Moths described in 1937
Epanastasis